In baseball, an assist (denoted by A) is a defensive statistic, baseball being one of the few sports in which the defensive team controls the ball. An assist is credited to every defensive player who fields or touches the ball (after it has been hit by the batter) prior to the recording of a putout, even if the contact was unintentional. For example, if a ball strikes a player's leg and bounces off him to another fielder, who tags the baserunner, the first player is credited with an assist. A fielder can receive a maximum of one assist per out recorded. An assist is also credited if a putout would have occurred, had another fielder not committed an error. For example, a shortstop might field a ground ball cleanly, but the first baseman might drop his throw. In this case, an error would be charged to the first baseman, and the shortstop would be credited with an assist. Unlike putouts, exactly one of which is awarded for every defensive out, an out can result in no assists being credited (as in strikeouts, fly outs and line drives), or in assists being credited to multiple players (as in relay throws and rundown plays). Third base, or 3B, is the third of four stations on a baseball diamond which must be touched in succession by a baserunner in order to score a run for that player's team. A third baseman is the player on the team playing defense who fields the area nearest third base, and is responsible for the majority of plays made at that base. In the scoring system used to record defensive plays, the third baseman is assigned the number 5. The third baseman requires good reflexes in reacting to batted balls, often being the closest infielder (roughly 90–120 feet) to the batter. The third base position requires a strong and accurate arm, as the third baseman often makes long throws to first base. The third baseman sometimes must throw quickly to second base in time to start a double play, and must also field fly balls in both fair and foul territory.

Third basemen are most commonly credited with an assist when they field a ground ball and throw the ball either to the first baseman to retire the batter/runner, or to the second baseman to force out a runner, perhaps beginning a double play. Other common ways in which third basemen gain an assist are by throwing out a runner attempting to score (perhaps on a squeeze play), perhaps on a relay throw from the left fielder, rundown plays in which a runner is stranded between bases, throwing out a runner attempting to steal home on a pickoff throw, and throwing to first or second base after catching a line drive in order to retire a runner before they can tag up. Third basemen typically accumulate fewer assists than second basemen or shortstops due to the frequency of ground balls to the middle infielders, but far more than players at other positions.

Because the physical demands of playing third base historically hindered players from having long careers at the position, all but three of the 25 third basemen with the longest careers have reached the major leagues since 1943; even as increasing strikeouts in baseball have reduced the frequency of other defensive outs including ground outs, longer seasons and careers in recent decades have more than compensated for the difference. The top 15 leaders in career assists at third base all reached the major leagues after 1950, and all but nine of the top 62 single-season totals have been recorded since 1957. Brooks Robinson is the all-time leader in career assists as a third baseman with 6,205, which was 1,624 more than any other player at the time of his retirement; he remains the only third baseman with more than 6,000 career assists.

Key

List

Stats updated as of the end of the 2022 season.

Other Hall of Famers

Notes

References

External links

Major League Baseball statistics
Assists as a third baseman